Wünschendorf/Elster (before 8 February 2013: Ländereck) is a Verwaltungsgemeinschaft ("collective municipality") in the district of Greiz, in Thuringia, Germany. The seat of the Verwaltungsgemeinschaft is in Wünschendorf/Elster.

The Verwaltungsgemeinschaft Wünschendorf/Elster consists of the following municipalities:

Braunichswalde 
Endschütz 
Gauern 
Hilbersdorf 
Kauern 
Linda bei Weida 
Paitzdorf 
Rückersdorf 
Seelingstädt
Teichwitz
Wünschendorf/Elster

References

Verwaltungsgemeinschaften in Thuringia